Carry the Kettle Nakoda Nation (also known as Assiniboine First Nation or Assiniboine 76) is a Nakota (Assiniboine) First Nation located about  east of Regina, Saskatchewan and  south of Sintaluta. The reservation is in Treaty 4 territory.

The Cypress Hills, known as traditional Nakoda/Assiniboine territory are within the boundaries of treaty 4. Bands signed treaty and were also given Reservations within their traditional territories.

Other previous names of the Carry the Kettle Nakoda/Assiniboine  band have been:
 
Chief Man Who Takes the Coat Reserve #76
Chief Long Lodge Reserve #77
Hurricane Hills reserve #76
Jack's Reserve #76
Indian Head reserve #76
Assiniboine Reserve #76
Carry the Kettle First Nation #76
Assiniboine #76
 
The community now has published history. The latest history book is called: 
 
Owóknage
The Story of Carry The Kettle Nakoda First Nation
by (author) Carry the Kettle First Nation
 
contributions by Jim Tanner, Tracey Tanner, David R. Miller & Peggy Martin McGuire
 
PUBLISHER
University of Regina Press
INITIAL PUBLISH DATE
Oct 2021
 
This book is available online and all over at most book stores

History

The band are modern day descendants of the victims of the ‘Cypress Hills Massacre’ of 1873 on Battle Creek, Cypress Hills, NWT. This event happened on June 1, 1873.  It was one of the final events that prompted the Canadian Federal government to create the North West Mounted Police (now the RCMP). The NWMP arrived to the massacre site two years later in 1875 and investigated the Massacre.  They were unable to bring the American Wolfers (perpetrators) to justice.  Carry the Kettle elders and survivor accounts say that 300 of their ancestors died on the day of the massacre.

Shortly after the Great March west in 1874, the newly created NWMP avoided the Cypress Hills and went around the north slope and went to create Fort McLeod that fall. In the Spring of 1875 the NWMP ‘F’ division would enter this cypress hills via the west end (Fort McLeod to the hills trail) to investigate the Cypress Hills Massacre. At this time, the NWMP referred to the band as the ‘Cypress Mountain Assiniboine’. Cypress Mountain being located today at Elk Water, AB.

Fort Walsh was established that summer of 1875 and was just 1.5 miles north of the actual Massacre site and Farwell and Solomon's trading posts.

In 1859, John Palliser's expedition (Irene Spry) identified the Cypress Hills as "Assiniboine country/territory" after meeting Blackfoot guides near present-day Medicine Hat, AB.  When Palliser asked the Blackfeet to join them on the trek into the Cypress Hills, the instantly refused so. The Blackfeet guides told Palliser that those are their enemies and the hills were Assiniboine country.. 	The Palliser Expedition: The Dramatic Story of Western Canadian Exploration, 1857-1860
Western Canadian classics
Author	Irene M. Spry
Edition	2, illustrated, reprint
Publisher	Fifth House Publishers, 1995

1873 Cypress Hill Massacre

1875 the North West Mounted police identified the tribe as the ‘Cypress Mountain Assiniboine’ during their investigation of the Cypress Hills Massacre.

1876 Battle of Little Big Horn, Canadas Treaty commission was in treaty 6 territory.

1877 Sitting Bull and the Lakota tribe enter into Canada.  This forced many bands north of the border into treaty and into reservations.

July 1977.  Sitting Bull and Lakota accept an offer of tobacco to join Nakoda Chiefs Man Who Takes the Coat and Long Lodge for sundance ceremony at Medicine Lodge Coulee at Head of the Mountain.

1879. Dewdney makes reference to the ‘Assiniboine Reserve’ at the head of the mountain as well as the ‘government farm’.  Beef rations and other treaty known provisions were being dispersed in July and October 1879 at the Head of the Mountain.

1879. Last signs of the Buffalo on the great prairies.

Spring 1880, Father Lacombe was headed to the Cypress Hills to start a school.

Spring 1880. DLS surveyor AP Patrick starts his survey for Chiefs Man Who Takes the Coat and Lond Lodge also at the head of the mountain at the west end of the cypress hills.

Spring 1880. The band plants its first successful crop at Head of the Mountain on the Maple Creek.

May 1881.  Canada decides to reroute Canadian Pacific railway south.

May 1881.  The Nakoda bands plant their second successful crop at the head of the mountain reserve.

Summer 1881. Reports of starvation among the first nations in the cypress hills.  Many go far to hunt.  Many are absent for treaty payments in the hills.   Reports of successful farming via the home farm policy start to be reported as failure in the Cypress Hills.

July 1881. Sitting Bull is starved back to the United States.

April 1882. After five failed attempts of obtaining a valid land surrender as per Indian act, chiefs man who takes the coat and long lodge are removed from their reserve in the cypress hills in what was described as a military escort to new reserves near Indian Head.

June 11, 1882.  The band arrives at present day Indian head.

November 1882.  The construction of the Canadian pacific railway stops and newly created swift current for the winter.

August 1882.  The Nakoda chiefs Man Who Takes the Coat and Long Lodge return to their cypress hills reserve.

April - May 1883.  Construction of the railroad continues.  Pierces the eastern boundary of the original Assiniboine Reserve at present day Walsh, AB.

May 1883.  The Assiniboine band are loaded up on flat deck rail cart at Maple Creek station.  Destined for back east to Indian Head reserve.

1885- The hanging of 11 Indians at Fort Battleford was marked by a very interesting comment by a Nakoda sentenced to hang. Words of Wawanetch, member of Lean Mans Assiniboine band, formerly of Assiniboine tribe of treaty 4 in cypress hills.   Words to Middleton: “the creator sees all, you stole our land and our children”.  Lean Man signed adhesion to treaty 4 along with Man Who Takes the Coat and Long Lodge. He later joined Mosquito and Grizzly Bears head in treaty 6 in 1882.

Source: 
Strange Empire: A Narrative of the Northwest
Joseph Kinsey Howard
Pickle Partners Publishing, Dec 1, 2018

The Nakoda bands nickname for James Morrow Walsh is “wahankšija” or Grizzly Bear as he commanded and received great respect from the Indigenous nations in the Cypress Hills.

Treaty 4 adhesion

The ancestors of the nation signed adhesion to Treaty 4 at Fort Walsh on September 25, 1877. The three Assiniboine chiefs who signed the treaty were Man Who Takes The Coat (Cuwiknaga Je Eyaku, in the Assiniboine/Nakoda language), Long Lodge (Teepee Hanska), and Lean Man (Wica Hostaka). After signing the treaty, the federal government began creating three separate reserves in the fall of 1879 in the Cypress Hills for these 3 Assiniboine, treaty 4 signatory chiefs. as Edgar Dewdney made his way into the Cypress Hills as the new Indian Commissioner and exercised the "duty to consult" in Treaties 4, 6, and 7 in 1879.

Treaty 4 reserve creation process included that chiefs and bands signed treaty in their traditional territory and that there we given reservations in these lands and near the location of where they signed the treaty.

The three chiefs who appear in the treaty 4 adhesion document were:  Chief Long Lodge, Chief Man Who Takes the Coat and Chief Lean Man.  All three chiefs had their own separate reservations created in the cypress hills in 1879. Long Lodge was the original and paramount chief of the Cypress Mountain Assiniboine (Current day Carry the Kettle people).

The summer of 1877 Nakoda Chiefs Man Who Takes the Coat and Long Lodge would receive their treaty provisions and annuities at Fort Walsh.  They would receive them in the Cypress Hills from 1877 until 1882.  David Laird of the Canadian Government recognized and acknowledged that, they are the only band to receive their annuities at Fort Walsh, since the words of Commissioner Laird being: “this being their country”

J.J. English and the government, Indian and home farms at Head of the Mountain.  The government and Dewdney set out to establish  4 southern farming agencies in the fall of 1879.  Three in treaty 7 and one at the Head of the Mountain.  The instructor at the Head of the Mountain farm was J.J. English. These 4 farms were designed to teach the bands how to farm and where separate entities off the reserve.  There were at least three farms within the vicinity of Head of the Mountain.  Two for the Chiefs Long Lodge and Man Who Takes the Coat (on reserve, one in medicine Lodge coulee (18 miles west of Fort Walsh) and the other the maple Creek (10 miles north). These farms were both separate from the government farm.  The government farms were established to be central farming operations near multiple reserves and to give sustenance to bands in need of hard times.  

The Indian farm to the north was on the Maple Creek.  The treaty 4 text states that the westernmost boundary of the treaty runs south west down to the south Saskatchewan River to the ‘mouth of maple Creek’, thence along that creek down the western extremity of the cypress hills to the international boundary’.  John McCoun also identifies this Creek being called Maple Creek in 1880 as he identifies that this is the only Creek that sends the waters of Cypress Hills to the South Saskatchewan River.  This Creek was located at the north west end end of the hills.  In 1883 this Creek was later renamed Ross Creek.  
So JJ English did have connection to the Assiniboine on their farm on Maple Creek within their 340m2 reservation from years 1879-1881.  Of course once plans were evident of the CPR reroute in May of 1881 of going through the reserve, all efforts were made to obtain a legal land surrender for the Assiniboine reserve were under way. 

The band feels that’s Canada did recognize this reserve as legal as everything was met on the bands and Canada’s end for reserve creation at the time. 

Surveys were conducted by DLS surveyors and appointed and instructed by Dewdney right out in the field. 

Canada claims that reports of prevelent frost up at Head of the Mountain on crops is a valid reason as to why they uprooted and surrendered reserves while there was multiple other places to put the farms on the reserves. Was this a valid reason for Canada to move bands and their reserves to other places?  Was it a part of the home farm policy to immediately remove and surrender reserves after one poor crop?  In the 2000 ICC document its been said that that was the whole reason why Dewdney decided to relocate the Assiniboine to Indian Head.  Frost on the crops. 

In 1883-84 a surveyor who visited the Blackfoot crossing for reasons a completely different for reserve creation purposes made reference that there was a government report that frost was prevalent at the crops at the Blackfoot crossing Indian home farm. The surveyor refuted this report and said that it was simply impossible for frost to damage the crops on the Blackfoot reserve at Blackfoot crossing.  The Blackfoot crossing would be near the route of the CPR in 1883.  

Were faulty reports of frost on the government, Indian, home farms on reserves in 1879-1883 enough justification for the government to remove or surrender Indian bands and their lands in the west?

Reserve creation

The Assiniboine/Nakoda has their reserve established in the western end Cypress Hills, at the Head of the Mountain in Alberta, because this was where their ceremonies were held and this where they called home.

The farming instructor for the Assiniboine reserve at the Head of the Mountain was J.J. English of Omeemee Ontario. English would establish a place of residence on the reserve and would locate the home farm near the Head of the Mountain.  English was an experienced farmer and knew that Barley and Potatoes would yield when shielded in certain coulees at the high altitude. English helped show the Assiniboine how the farm and had at least two successful crops at the Assiniboine reserve home farm at the head of the Mountain in 1880 and 1881.  Prior to their first removal in April 1882 the Assiniboine band planted what was to be the final crop on their Cypress Hills Assiniboine Reserve where the product was used to feed other starving tribes around Fort Walsh.

The Fort Walsh Indian Agency was established in the fall of 1879.  The first Indian Agent there was Edwin Allen.  After Allen was charged with theft in July of 1881, he was replaced by NWMP James Colvin who acted as the Indian agent based at Fort Walsh until the summer of 1882.  Colvin would immediately join the CPR company and would pass away in Calgary in 1885.  

In 1880 John McCoun a DLS hired by Canada to survey the northwest in his booked call the ‘great northwest makes several references to the Assiniboine Reserve at the Head of the Mountain from 1879 to 1881.

The newly appointed Indian Commissioner Edgar E Dewdney would visit and acknowledge the ‘Assiniboine Reserve’ at the head of the mountain twice in 1879. Once in July and the other in October.  With its locality being at the Head of the Mountain at the west end of the Cypress Hills. (Dewdneys Journals, Glenbow). Further Dewdney would also appoint JJ English as farm instructor in his papers.

The NWMP police surgeon who cared for the Assiniboine at the Head of the Mountain was Dr. George Kittson of St. Paul Minnesota. In the fall of 1879 the Department of Indian Affairs would rent out office space at the Fort Walsh townsite for Kittson and Edwin Allen.  Indian Affairs would cover half of Kittsons Salary.  In 1884 Kittson resigned from the police force and returned to St. Paul where we would die of an apparent morphine overdose and his NWMP daily log journals were never found.

McCoun mentions in 1880 an event where a two Blackfeet warriors snuck into the Large Assiniboine camp at the west end of the Cypress hills at Elk Water Lake and stole two horses in the middle of the night. He noted that the Assiniboine were camped in a large circle with each tibi no longer than 7–8 feet apart.

After the Battle of the Little Bighorn in the summer of 1876, the Cypress Mountain Assiniboine invited Sitting Bull's Lakohta tribe for a Sun Dance at the Medicine Lodge coulee south of the Head of the Mountain. (18 miles west of Fort Walsh) AG Irvine of the NWMP mentions meeting Long Lodge and this Nakoda/ Assiniboine band at the west end of the Cypress Hills as he was on his way to meet Sitting Bull at Fort Walsh in 1877.

The NWMP book vol 1 and 2 by Turner also acknowledged the early NWMP troops witnessing a sundance at medicine lodge coulee in 1876.

In 1876 a group of American Assiniboine who were led by ‘Crows Dance’ had stolen some horses from Little Child's Cree/Saulteaux tribe near Fort Walsh.  Crows Dance would take the horses to the west end of the cypress hills to a large Assiniboine camp near Head of the Mountain.  In the book Sitting Bulls Boss, tells of when JM Walsh wrote to his daughter about this event.  He mentioned that their officers went the area what is now known as Elk Water Lake, AB and apprehended Crows Dance and about 16 of his warriors without any trouble in the middle of the night.

AG Irvine would boast about this event and of JM Walsh's skill as a great leader and respected figure by the CTK ancestors and leaders of the Cypress Mountain Assiniboine in one of his annual reports.

Allan Ponytz Patrick, the reserve's dominion land surveyor, called the area the Assiniboine Reserve in the Cypress Hills.  He surveyed the reserve in 1879.

The Nakoda elders refer to their ancestral home in the Cypress Hills as Wazihe (the mountain by itself). Elders also speak of Hay-Ipa (literally in Nakoda language: Head of a Mountain, a spiritual place for the Nakoda). The original Assiniboine Reservation at the Head of the Mountain covered .

In May 1881, the federal government decided to re-route the Canadian Pacific Railway (CPR) south through the reserve instead of the (original) present-day Highway 16 route. To complete the CPR southbound route, Indian Agent based at Fort Walsh Edwin Allen tried to obtain a legal land surrender and Edgar E Dewdney began writing contradicting reports about farming at Cypress Hills Assiniboine Reserve at Head of the Mountain . Dewdney claimed that farming in the Cypress Hills would be a failure, and used this claim to justify the unlawful removal, genocide, and breach of trust of many Treaty 4 and Indian Act laws by him and John A. Macdonald. MacDonald received a large kickback from the Sand's Mill, which took timber from the Assiniboine reserve for the railway. Sands Mill was located right at Elk Water Lake ( on the Assiniboine Reserve). 
 
The Cypress Hills reserve was never legally surrendered as per the Indian Act after 5 attempts by government officials were futile for taking the Reservation

The government sent Edwin Allen five times to obtain a land surrender from Chief Cuwiknaga Je Eyaku (Man who Takes the Coat), Teepee Hanska (Long Lodge), and Wica Hostaka (Lean Man). Carry the Kettle elders say in oral history that no land surrender was ever obtained. These attempts began in July 1881 and continued until April 1882. Since the CPR was approaching, the Assiniboine people had to be removed. After they were starved, the first removal of the Assiniboine from the Cypress Hills Reserve occurred in April 1882; they arrived south of Qu'Appelle and Indian Head in June 1882. The Assiniboine did not want the new reserves, and were not consulted. The entire band walked over 500 kilometres from the Cypress Hills to now present day Carry the Kettle reserve south of Sintaluta and Indian Head once in 1882 and again in 1883.

The Nakoda/Assiniboine still wanted to live at original their reserve at the west end of the Cypress Hills at Head of the Mountain, spiritually significant since they held their annual Sun Dance and vision quests in the Medicine Lodge coulee. The Band returned to their Cypress Hills Assiniboine reserve at the west end of the Cypress Hills in October 1882. They starved that winter of 1882–1883.

In August 1882, Long Lodge and others left IH and returned to their original reserve in the Cypress Hills in fall of 1882. Due to starvation that winter, they were forced to return to Indian Head reserve the next spring.  In may of 1883 the band was put on flat deck railway carts at the newly created town of Maple Creek.

According to Carry the Kettle elders, their train derailed while east bound near Swift Current.; many Assiniboine died, and the survivors walked the rest of the way to Indian Head. After two removals, the 1880 Cypress Hills Assiniboine Reserve population was about 1,700 people; the 1883 population of Assiniboine, south of Indian Head and Qu'Appelle, was 300.  Two reservations were surveyed for the tribe near Qu' Appelle in April 1882.  These were for Chiefs Man Who Takes the Coat (220m2) and one for Chief Long Lodge (120m2). Today Carry the Kettle First Nation #76 is made up of members of both tribes on a significantly smaller land base of only 63m2.  (Man who takes the coat and long lodge)

As per treaty 4 and Indian act reserve creation processes the dominion land surveyor would survey one square mile for a family of 
5 band members.  The 340 square mile surveyed for Chiefs Man Who Takes the Coat and Long Lodge at the Head of the Mountain (Cypress Hills Assiniboine Reserve) in 1879 was enough for 1700 band members.  This would have been the largest reserve ever created in Canada and the Cypress Mountain Assiniboine would have been one of the largest bands in Canada.

Populations of the two bands combined in 1884 at Indian Head, after the two forced removal from their original reserve in the cypress hills was 350 band members.  This population was taken by official Indian affairs reports.

Present day

In 2000, the Indian Claims Commission ruled that Canada had no lawful obligation to Cega’kin (Carry the Kettle) and that no reservation was legally established at Cypress Hills for Assiniboine descendants from 1879 to 1882. In 2014, the land claim was in federal court.

The Indian Claims Commission relied heavily on a report done for the department of Indian Affairs by James (Jim) Gallo.

Gallo states in the document that the Assiniboine reserve could not have been established and recognized because there was no reserve creation activity in the Cypress Hills because the nearest Indian Affairs office was at Swan River, MB.  However the Fort Walsh Town Site had an Indian Affairs Office established in the Cypress Hills in 1879.  Edwin Allen was the first Indian Agent there.

Canada further states a variety of other reasons as to why they did not officially accept the Assiniboine Reserve in cypress hills as legal.  All of these statements in the 2000 ICC document contradict the official 1880 annual report of the department of Indian Affairs. In the 1880 report, AP Patrick did have the authority to conduct the reserve surveys.  That year he completed and submitted 7 Indian Reserve surveys to the department. The seven were:  Assiniboine Reserve Cypress Hills, Peepeekisis, Starblanket, O’Soup (Cowessess) kahkewistahaw, Okanese, Little Black Bear. (All treaty 4)  These reserves were all recognized and accepted as legal reserves in the 1880 according to the Canada Department of Indian Affairs Annual report.

The present-day Carry the Kettle reserve is south of Sintaluta and covers  well short of the original Cypress Hills Assiniboine reserve that was surveyed at 340 square miles at the west end of the Cypress hills.

Carry the Kettle today consists of two separate treaty signatory chiefs bands of Man Who Takes the Coat and Long Lodge.  Each chief had their own reservations in the cypress hills and near Indian Head later after their removal. After Long Lodges #77 people were put into Man Who Takes the Coat #76, the two bands mysteriously became one. After the death of Chief Man Who Takes the Coat in 1891. The department of Indian affairs appointed Carry the Kettle Chief.

Carry the Kettle #76 /MWTTC #76 original land base south of Indian Head was originally 220m2.  It stayed this size will into the 1890s.

Carry the Kettle First Nation is close to settle the 1905 Surrender Specific claim and it is in the final stages.

In October 2022 at a federal court room in Saskatoon, the elders of Carry the Kettle Nakoda Nation shared their elder oral testimony for their connections to the Cypress Hills Assiniboine Reserve.

Carry the Kettle sued the federal and Saskatchewan governments in December 2017 to halt development which would infringe on its members' rights to hunt and gather. In January 2020, it was announced that the nation would join Indigenous Bloom in a cannabis facility on reserve land.

Other previous names of the band have been:
 
Chief Man Who Takes the Coat Reserve #76
Chief Long Lodge Reserve #77
Hurricane Hills reserve #76
Jack's Reserve #76
Indian Head reserve #76
Assiniboine Reserve #76
Carry the Kettle First Nation #76
Assiniboine #76
 
The community now has published history. The latest history book is called: 
 
Owóknage
The Story of Carry The Kettle Nakoda First Nation
by (author) Carry the Kettle First Nation
 
contributions by Jim Tanner, Tracey Tanner, David R. Miller & Peggy Martin McGuire
 
PUBLISHER
University of Regina Press
INITIAL PUBLISH DATE
Oct 2021
 
This book is available online and all over at most book stores

References

First Nations in Saskatchewan
First Nations in Alberta